The Chinese Puzzle is a 1919 British silent crime film directed by Fred Goodwins and starring Leon M. Lion, Lilian Braithwaite and Milton Rosmer. It was an adaptation of the play The Chinese Puzzle written by Lion and Marion Bower.

Plot
A Mandarin takes the blame when the wife of his friend's son steals secret papers.

Cast
 Leon M. Lion ⁣— Marquis Li Chung
 Lilian Braithwaite⁣ — Lady de la Haye
 Milton Rosmer — Sir Roger de la Haye
 Sybil Arundale — Naomi Melsham
 Dora De Winton — Mrs Melsham
 Charles Rock — Sir Aylmer Brent
 Reginald Bach — Henrik Stroom
 Sam Livesey — Paul Markatel
 Alexander Sarner — Raoul d'Armand

References

External links

1919 films
Films directed by Fred Goodwins
1919 crime films
Ideal Film Company films
British crime films
British films based on plays
British silent feature films
British black-and-white films
1910s English-language films
1910s British films